The Morane-Saulnier Type P (official designations MS.21, MS.24 and MS.26) was a French parasol wing two-seat reconnaissance aeroplane of the First World War. Morane-Saulnier built 595 for the French air force, and it was also used by the British until 1916-17.

Development

In addition to being fitted with ailerons and having a more streamlined fuselage, the Type P was faster and better armed than its better known ancestor, the Type L (MS.3) and had a more developed structure compared to the intermediate Morane-Saulnier LA (MS.4).

Three versions were built under Morane-Saulnier's factory designation of Type P, the first being the MS.21, which although externally similar to the Type LA, had its internal structure completely redesigned, with the most visible evidence being the more robust center section struts, and with other details borrowed from the Type N (MS.5), such as a substantial spinner, known as the "casserole".

The MS.24 was built specifically for the Royal Flying Corps to operate alongside their Morane-Saulnier LAs while replacing those lost to attrition, but due to shortages of the  Le Rhône rotary engine used in the MS.21, it was powered by an  Le Rhône. The RFC also operated the MS.21.

The MS.26 was similar to the MS.21, but was fitted with a  Le Rhône engine which was enclosed in a full cowling, and like the 24, dispensed with the  spinner commonly found on the MS.21.

Variants

Type P 
 Factory designation
MS.21
 Official designation of initial version powered with a  Le Rhône 9J engine
MS.24
 Official designation of RFC version powered with a  Le Rhône 9C engine
MS.26
 Official designation of final version powered with a  Le Rhône 9Jc engine
Rouleur/Penguin
 Examples of other variants modified with wing area reduced to act as ground handling trainers.
Chasseur
 Two examples were converted into single seat fighters, the first had the observer's position covered over, the second had the pilot moved back and the wing lowered.

Operators
 
Brazilian Air Force
 
French Air Force
 
Imperial Japanese Army Air Service
 
Imperial Russian Air Service
 
Royal Flying Corps

Specifications (Type P/MS.21)

See also

References

Citations

Bibliography
Bruce, J.M. The Aeroplanes of the Royal Flying Corps (Military Wing). London: Putnam, 1982. .

Further reading

1910s French military reconnaissance aircraft
P
Parasol-wing aircraft
Single-engined tractor aircraft
Aircraft first flown in 1914
Rotary-engined aircraft